Thomas Christopher Rowe (born 16 October 1993 in Truro) is an English List A cricketer active since 2013 who has played for Nottinghamshire.

References

External links

1993 births
English cricketers
Nottinghamshire cricketers
Living people
Cornwall cricketers
Sportspeople from Truro
21st-century English people